Leonard "Leo" Canjels (1 April 1933 – 26 May 2010) was a Dutch international footballer who played for NAC Breda.

Playing career

Club
Canjels started playing football at Breda side VV Baronie. He made his debut for NAC in the 1956/1957 season and played seven years for the club before retiring. As a NAC Breda player, Canjels twice won the Eredivisie top goalscorers award, in 1958 and 1959.

Canjels was nicknamed Het Kanon (the Gun) because of his powerful shooting.

International
Canjels made his debut for the Netherlands in a May 1959 friendly match against Turkey and earned a total of 3 caps, scoring 2 goals. He won his other caps in friendlies against Bulgaria and Scotland in the same year.

Managerial career
After retiring as a player, Canjels became a coach, first at amateur sides Dongen and Baronie and later managed NAC Breda, as well as Club Brugge and Cercle Brugge among others in Belgium. With Brugge he won the Belgian league title in 1973.

He retired from coaching in 1990.

He died on May 26, 2010 after a long illness.

References

External links
 
 Player profile at Voetbal International 
  
 
  

1933 births
2010 deaths
Footballers from Breda
Association football forwards
Dutch footballers
Netherlands international footballers
NAC Breda players
Eredivisie players
Dutch football managers
NAC Breda managers
Club Brugge KV head coaches
MVV Maastricht managers
K. Patro Eisden Maasmechelen managers
K. Beringen F.C. managers
Cercle Brugge K.S.V. managers
K.V. Mechelen managers
S.C. Eendracht Aalst managers
Dutch expatriate football managers
Expatriate football managers in Belgium